Star Trek: Starfleet Academy – Starship Bridge Simulator is a video game for the Super Nintendo Entertainment System and Sega Genesis 32X systems that was released in 1994 by Interplay, the same group that produced many later Star Trek starship games.

Reception
Reviewing the Super NES version, Bro' Buzz of GamePro described it as "solid but low-key". He criticized the sound effects but praised the easy-to-use control interface, variety of game play, and numerous Star Trek references, and gave the game an overall positive recommendation. Next Generation reviewed the SNES version of the game, rating it two stars out of five, and stated that "It's a game, Jim, but not as we'd like it."

The four reviewers of Electronic Gaming Monthly scored the 32X version a respectable 6.675 out of 10, but thoroughly panned the game, stating that the graphics, sound, and gameplay are all virtually identical to those of the Super Nintendo original. One of the reviewers also remarked that the game is "great for fans, but too complex for regular players." Bro' Buzz likewise said the 32X version is no different from the year-old Super NES version. He also criticized that the gameplay, while sometimes interesting, is marred by intervals of dull inactivity, such as when warping.

See also
 Star Trek: Starfleet Academy, a 1997 video game

References

External links
 Star Trek: Starfleet Academy - Starship Bridge Simulator at MobyGames

1994 video games
High Voltage Software games
Interplay Entertainment games
Sega 32X games
Starfleet Academy Starship Bridge Simulator
Super Nintendo Entertainment System games
Starship Bridge Simulator
Video games scored by Brian L. Schmidt
Video games developed in the United States
Multiplayer and single-player video games